Lat Luang is a town (Thesaban Mueang) in the Phra Pradaeng District (Amphoe) of Samut Prakan Province in the Bangkok Metropolitan Region of Central Thailand. In 2014, it had a total population of 73,938 people.

References

Populated places in Samut Prakan province